The Uniform Invoice or Unified Invoice, is a type of receipt in Taiwan that is issued by merchants for selling products and services, kept by both seller and consumer, with a 8-digit number for each one, for taxation proposes, managed by the Ministry of Finance of the  Republic of China (Taiwan) existence in many form such as hand-written 2-copy, 3-copy, and printed with cashier, and recently electric Uniform Invoice. Uniform Invoice also features a lottery-like feature drawn every two months.

Description 

The Uniform Invoice and lottery featuring was conceptualized by the first Kuomintang (KMT) finance chief, Jen Hsien-qun, to boost tax revenues in the early days of the KMT government. The introduction of this lottery on January 1, 1951, encouraged locals to obtain receipts for every purchase made with businesses with a monthly turnover of NT$200,000 (US$6,200) and above. As a result, the Finance Ministry collected NT$51 million (US$1.6 million) that year, representing a 75% increase from the NT$29 million (US$900,000) collected in 1950.

The lottery drawing in Taiwan held on the 25th of every odd-numbered month, i.e., January, March, May, July, September and November. Six sets of eight-digit numbers are drawn and announced in a 'live' televised ceremony presented by an emcee, during which four models roll out the winning numbers from hand-turned lottery machines. Six prizes are announced during the ceremony. As of 2011, the “Special Prize” has been increased from NT$2 million (US$63,000) to NT$10 million (US$342,000). “First Prize” of NT$200,000 (US$6,200) are offered to customers with the receipts matching the 8-digit numbers drawn. Subsequent prizes valued at NT$40,000 (US$1,300), NT$10,000 (US$313), NT$4,000 (US$136), NT$1,000 (US$31) and NT$200 (US$7) are available to receipt holders who match the final 7, 6, 5, 4 and 3 digits, respectively, on their invoices. In keeping with Taiwan's "convenience store culture", some major convenience store chains will redeem receipts for the smallest (NT$200) prize by allowing customers to buy that amount of products with a winning receipt; larger prizes must be redeemed at a government tax ministry office.

In conjunction with the 60th anniversary of the invoice lottery, the Finance Ministry announced a 33% increase in the total prize value to NT$7 billion (US$20 million) in 2011.

The Ministry started an e-invoice initiative in 2006 with the intention of facilitating e-commerce and reducing the number of receipts that need to be physically printed (currently about 11.5 billion every year). Lee Sush-der of the Ministry of Finance indicated that if 8 billion paper receipts could be replaced with e-invoices, 80,000 trees could be saved. The intermediate goal is to reduce the invoice process cost by NT$7.4 billion by 2013, with an expected total savings of NT$120 billion once comprehensive e-invoicing becomes the norm. E-receipts set for trial run.

See also
Gambling in Taiwan
Economy of Taiwan

References

External links

Uniform Invoice Main Page (English)

Lottery games
Economy of Taiwan
Gambling in Taiwan
1951 establishments in Taiwan